Horror of Fang Rock is the first serial of the 15th season of the British science fiction television series Doctor Who, which was first broadcast in four weekly parts on BBC1 from 3 to 24 September 1977.

The serial is set on the fictional English island of Fang Rock in the early 20th century, where a shapeshifting alien scout called a Rutan arrives on Earth intending to use the planet as a strategic base in the Rutans' war against the Sontarans.

Plot

On the way to show Brighton to Leela, the TARDIS lands on the island of Fang Rock off the south coast of England in the early 20th century. Noticing that the lighthouse isn't functioning properly, the Fourth Doctor decides to investigate, as well as to ask for directions, as the TARDIS seems to have got 'lost in the fog'.  Upon arrival at the lighthouse, and after introducing themselves, the Doctor discovers the dead body of one of the keepers, Ben. The other two keepers, old superstitious Reuben and the keen young Vince Hawkins, report that a light fell from the sky near the island. They also explain the electricity flow to the lamp on the lighthouse has become erratic and the Doctor deduces something is feeding on the flow. Reuben does not help matters with his constant references to the mythical Beast of Fang Rock, which reputedly once terrorised the lighthouse. As the Doctor and Leela explore, something moves Ben's body out of the lighthouse and onto the island, and they witness a curious electric crackling which seems to have killed fish nearby.

The loss of the electric light due to the unexplained draining of power from the generators causes a luxury yacht to crash onto Fang Rock. The four survivors are brought to the lighthouse: the bosun Harker; Colonel James Skinsale MP; the owner, Lord Palmerdale; and his highly strung secretary Adelaide Lessage. Over time it emerges Palmerdale has bought government secrets from Skinsale and was desperate to reach the stock exchange to make a killing – hence the reason the ship was travelling at such a pace.

Harker and the Doctor retrieve Ben's body and the Time Lord deduces it has been used as an anatomy lesson for an alien life form. He determines that their best protection is to secure the lighthouse to keep the creature out. Reuben then disappears for a time and then reappears a changed man, which the others put down to shock. Palmerdale is killed in the lamp room by a glowing alien presence on the outside of the lighthouse, and then Harker is killed in the boiler room. From the alien light emanating from Reuben, it is clear he has become possessed or transformed by the alien creature. The Doctor finds Harker's body and then Reuben's own – the latter cold for some time – which means the creature in Reuben's form has chameleonic properties.

The creature then stalks and kills the others in the lighthouse. With its presence now revealed, the alien sheds its disguise, revealing it to be a Rutan, a green blob-like amphibious life form, whose scout ship crash-landed in the sea and is trying to summon its mother ship. With the Rutans losing a long war against their hereditary enemies, the Sontarans, they plan to turn the strategically-located Earth into a base, from which they can launch a counterattack. However, once the Sontarans find the planet, they will certainly bombard Earth with photonic missiles, taking countless human lives in the process. The Doctor uses a flashbomb to disorient the Rutan, forcing it to retreat to the boiler room.  The Doctor and Skinsale retrieve diamonds from Palmerdale's body belt to use in modifying the lighthouse beacon, but Skinsale is killed by the Rutan in the process. The Doctor then modifies a flare mortar to destroy the alien, and then uses the diamonds as a focus for the electric lighthouse beam to convert it into a high-energy laser, with which he destroys the Rutan mothership. Disobeying the Doctor, Leela watches the laser destroy the ship and is momentarily blinded, and as a side effect, the blinding flash turns Leela's eyes from brown to blue. The Doctor quotes Wilfrid Wilson Gibson's poem Flannan Isle as they leave.

Production
Working titles for this story included The Monster of Fang Rock and The Beast of Fang Rock. Horror of Fang Rock was a late replacement for the scripts Terrance Dicks had originally submitted, a vampire-based tale entitled The Vampire Mutations, which was cancelled close to production as it was feared it could detract from the BBC's Count Dracula, a high-profile adaptation of Bram Stoker's classic novel Dracula, which was due for transmission close to when the serial would have aired. A re-written version did, however, eventually see production in 1980 as State of Decay, part of the eighteenth season of Doctor Who.

The serial is the only one of the original series to have been produced at BBC studios outside London. Engineering work at those studios meant that it was made at the Pebble Mill Studios of BBC Birmingham instead. According to the DVD commentary supplied by Louise Jameson, John Abbott and Terrance Dicks, a scene in part three was crucial to the behind-the-scenes relationship between Jameson and co-star Tom Baker. In one scene, he consistently came in ahead of his cue, thereby upstaging her. On the grounds that this move was "not what they had rehearsed" she insisted on three successive retakes until he came in at the rehearsed time. This eventually won his respect. From that point forward, she claims their working relationship was much smoother.

Louise Jameson stops wearing her brown contacts at the end of this serial, with the sudden change in colour being explained as a pigment dispersal caused by looking directly into a bright explosion. As mentioned in more than one DVD commentary Jameson had found the contacts painful to wear, and made their removal a condition for her agreeing to play Leela for another season.

The Ballad of Flannan Isle
Many elements of the episode were based on a poem, Flannan Isle by Wilfrid Wilson Gibson, which the Doctor quotes from at the end of the story; the poem itself was inspired by the mysterious disappearance of three lighthouse keepers from the Flannan Isles in 1900.

Cast notes
Alan Rowe had previously played Dr. Evans and provided the voice from Space Control in The Moonbase (1967) as well as Edward of Wessex in The Time Warrior (1973–74) and later appeared as Garif in the serial Full Circle (1980). Ralph Watson had previously played Captain Knight in The Web of Fear (1968) as well as Ettis in The Monster of Peladon (1974). Colin Douglas had previously played Donald Bruce in The Enemy of the World (1967–68).

Broadcast and reception

Paul Cornell, Martin Day, and Keith Topping wrote of the serial in The Discontinuity Guide (1995), "A masterpiece, designed to do nothing more than scare kids, which it does very efficiently. It's a very good Leela story, too." In The Television Companion (1998), David J. Howe and Stephen James Walker were also positive, describing it as "a tightly constructed drama that succeeds because of, rather than in spite of, its confined setting and limited cast". They praised the sets, atmosphere, and most of the acting. In Doctor Who: The Complete Guide, Mark Campbell awarded it ten out of ten, considering it "strong on atmosphere" and "a tense, scary tale that makes a virtue of its small cast and claustrophobic locale." He concluded that it was "superlative in every way".

In 2010, Mark Braxton of Radio Times awarded it four stars out of five, calling the serial "classy, cosy, autumnal Who", with many positives, including the good characterisation of Leela, the shock of the Doctor admitting he had done something wrong, and the characterisation of the lighthouse crew. The A.V. Club'''s Christopher Bahn was critical of the pacing of the end of the story and the "often unconvincing" special effects, but considered the serial to be, despite some flaws, "a classic base-under-siege chiller". Writing for The Guardian in 2019, Toby Hadoke described it as "a claustrophobic masterpiece dripping with mordant humour and suspense". For Den of Geek, Andrew Blair wrote that Leela's line "you will do as the Doctor says or I will cut out your heart" was his favourite Leela moment, adding that "what makes this scene even funnier is that the camera immediately cuts to the Doctor, who bursts into a massive grin." 

Max Headroom intrusion

On the night of 22 November 1987, a broadcast of the first part of Horror of Fang Rock by Chicago television station WTTW was interrupted for around a minute-and-a-half by a pirate broadcast featuring an unknown individual, who was disguised as the television character Max Headroom. The incident made national headlines and the people responsible were never identified.

Commercial Releases

In print

A novelisation of this serial, written by Terrance Dicks, was published by Target Books in March 1978. According to the DVD commentary, this novelisation features his favourite cover.

Home mediaHorror of Fang Rock'' was released on VHS in July 1998. It was released on Region 2 DVD in the United Kingdom on 17 January 2005, in Australia on Region 4 DVD on 7 April 2005, and in the United States on Region 1 DVD on 6 September 2005.

The soundtrack, with linking narration by Louise Jameson, was released on vinyl by Demon Records on 19 February 2021.

Notes

References

External links

Reviews
The Whoniverse's review on Horror of Fang Rock DVD

Target novelisation

BBC Birmingham productions
Fourth Doctor serials
Doctor Who pseudohistorical serials
Doctor Who serials novelised by Terrance Dicks
1977 British television episodes
Television episodes set in England
Works set in lighthouses